P. sterreri  may refer to:
 Parhippolyte sterreri, a crustacean species found in the Bahamas, Bermuda, Cuba and Mexico
 Platyops sterreri, a crustacean species endemic to Bermuda